Samuel B. Mclin served as Florida Secretary of State from 1873 until 1877. He was involved in Florida's delegate counting feud during the disputed 1876 United States presidential election.

References

19th-century American politicians
Secretaries of State of Florida
Year of birth unknown
Year of death unknown